Dubrava is a rural locality (a settlement) and the administrative center of Medovskoye Rural Settlement, Bogucharsky District, Voronezh Oblast, Russia. The population was 445 as of 2010. There are 8 streets.

Geography 
Dubrava is located 24 km southeast of Boguchar (the district's administrative centre) by road. Monastyrshchina is the nearest rural locality.

References 

Rural localities in Bogucharsky District